Esomus caudiocellatus is a species of cyprinid found in Irrawaddy River and Sittaung River drainages to the lower Salween basins in Myanmar.  It may also be found in nearby drainages on China and the Malay peninsula of western Thailand and northern Malaysia.

References

Fish of Myanmar
Fish described in 1923
Esomus